Wang Kai (born July 1962) is a Chinese politician currently serving as governor of Henan. Previously he served as party chief of Changchun, capital of northeast China's Jilin province. He entered the workforce in October 1983, and joined the Chinese Communist Party in December 1984.

Early life and education
Wang was born in Luoyang, Henan, in July 1962. After the resumption of college entrance examination, in 1979, he was admitted to Shanxi University, where he majored in political economics. After university in 1983, he became a teacher at Party School of Jincheng of the Chinese Communist Party. In September 1988, he entered the Renmin University of China, earning a master's degree in political economics.

Career
In July 1991, he was appointed an official of the Case Room of the Central Commission for Discipline Inspection, the party's agency in charge of anti-corruption efforts. In April 2001, he was transferred to southwest China's Guangxi and appointed vice mayor of Wuzhou. In August 2003, he was appointed head of the Organization Department of Wuzhou Municipal Party Committee and was admitted to member of the standing committee of the Party committee, the city's top authority. In September 2006, he was appointed deputy party chief, concurrently holding the mayor position since February 2008. During that time, he obtained a doctor's degree in economics from Wuhan University in June 2012. In January 2013 he became the deputy party chief of Yulin, rising to party chief the next year. He became a member of the Standing Committee of the CPC Guangxi Provincial Committee in November 2016 before being assigned to the similar position in northeast China's Jilin province in March 2017. He also served as head of the Organization Department of CPC Jilin Provincial Committee. In April 2019, he was named party chief of Changchun, replacing Wang Junzheng. In April 2021, he was transferred to his home-province Henan and appointed governor. It would be his first job as "first-in-charge" of a province. In October 2022, Wang was elected as a full member of the 20th Central Committee of the Communist Party of China.

References

1962 births
Living people
People from Luoyang
Shanxi University alumni
Renmin University of China alumni
Wuhan University alumni
People's Republic of China politicians from Henan
Chinese Communist Party politicians from Henan
Mayors of Yulin
Governors of Henan